The Kurdistan Region presidential elections of 2009 took place on 25 July 2009, coinciding with the 2009 Kurdistan Region parliamentary election. A total of 2.5 million citizens of Kurdistan Region were eligible to vote in the parliamentary and presidential elections. 
It is the first time that the President of Kurdistan Region was chosen directly through popular votes. People currently living outside Kurdistan Region were not allowed to vote.

Like the parliamentary elections, campaigning for the elections officially started on 22 June 2009 and was to be stopped 48 hours before voting starts. The elections were held with 84 registration centers and 5,403 polling stations and 5 polling stations in Baghdad. Below are the candidates listed with their lot number.

 Ahmed Mohammed Rasul 11 (also known as Safen Haji Sheikh Mohammed)
 Massoud Barzani 12 (Incumbent)
 Hussein Garmiyani 13 (a businessman)
 Halow Ibrahim Ahmed 14 (brother-in-law of Iraqi President Jalal Talabani) 
 Kamal Mirawdeli 15 (a London-based scholar)

Halow Ibrahim Ahmed was seen as the leading challenger to the incumbent.

Results
A total of 1,819,652 people, approximately 80% of the registered voters, participated in the election 

Initial reports gave Barzani 70 percent of the vote.

See also
Kurdistan National Assembly
Kurdistan Region

References

2009 elections in Iraq
2009 in Iraqi Kurdistan
2009
July 2009 events in Iraq